Simon Shercliff  (born 23 December 1972) is a British diplomat, and Ambassador to Iran.

Shercliff was educated at Wells Cathedral School. He graduated from the St Catharine's College, Cambridge in 1995, with a degree in Earth Sciences.

In the 2021 New Year Honours, Shercliff, then Director, National Security, Foreign, Commonwealth and Development Office was made a Companion of the Order of St Michael and St George (CMG) "For services to British foreign policy and National Security."

In August 2021, he became the British Ambassador to Iran.

He is married to Emma Louise Shercliff, and they have two children.

References

1972 births
Living people
People educated at Wells Cathedral School
Alumni of St Catharine's College, Cambridge
British diplomats
Companions of the Order of St Michael and St George
Ambassadors of the United Kingdom to Yemen
Ambassadors of the United Kingdom to Iran
Civil servants in the Foreign Office